Neder Kaleth Hernández Medina (born 26 January 2001) is a Mexican professional footballer who plays as a winger for Liga de Expansión MX club Atlético Morelia, on loan from Monterrey.

Career statistics

Club

Honours
Monterrey
CONCACAF Champions League: 2021

References

External links
 
 
 

Living people
2001 births
Association football forwards
C.F. Monterrey players
Liga de Expansión MX players
Liga MX players
Footballers from Nuevo León
Sportspeople from Monterrey
Raya2 Expansión players
Mexican footballers